"I Can't Feel You Anymore" is a song written by Theresa Beaty and Meredith Stewart that was originally performed by American country music artist Loretta Lynn. It was released as a single in April 1979 via MCA Records.

Background and reception 
"I Can't Feel You Anymore" was recorded at the Bradley's Barn on February 3, 1978. Located in Mount Juliet, Tennessee, the session was produced by renowned country music producer Owen Bradley. Three additional tracks were recorded during this session.

"I Can't Feel You Anymore" reached number three on the Billboard Hot Country Singles survey in 1980. Additionally, the song peaked at number two on the Canadian RPM Country Songs chart during this same period. It was included on her studio album, We've Come a Long Way Baby (1978).

Track listings 
7" vinyl single
 "I Can't Feel You Anymore" – 3:12
 "True Love Needs to Keep in Touch" – 2:25

Charts

References 

1979 songs
1979 singles
MCA Records singles
Loretta Lynn songs
Song recordings produced by Owen Bradley